Ning'an Road Subdistrict is a subdistrict of Xinhua District, Shijiazhuang, Hebei, People's Republic of China.

See also
List of township-level divisions of Hebei

References

Township-level divisions of Hebei